João Ratão is a 1940 Portuguese film directed by Jorge Brum do Canto and starring Óscar de Lemos, Maria Domingas and António Silva. It was released on 29 April 1940.

Cast
Óscar de Lemos
Maria Domingas
António Silva
Manuel Santos Carvalho
Teresa Cazal

References

External links

Films directed by Jorge Brum do Canto
Portuguese drama films
1940 drama films
1940 films
Portuguese black-and-white films
1940s Portuguese-language films